Mauricio García Araujo  (7 July 1930 – 19 December 2012)  was a Venezuelan economist who worked in both the private and public sectors. He was the president of the Central Bank of Venezuela between 1987 and 1989 during the presidency of Jaime Lusinchi (1984-1989).

Early life and education 
García Araujo was born on 7 July 1930 in Maracaibo, Venezuela. In 1953, he obtained a Bachelors degree in economics and a Master in Business Administration, both from Columbia University.

Public service 

García Araujo was part of Central Bank of Venezuela board of directors between 1968 and 1974. After thirteen years, he was elected president of Central Bank of Venezuela (1987-1989). He was also a member of the board of directos of Petróleos de Venezuela, S.A (PDVSA) and Corporación Venezolana de Guayana (CVG).

Private sector 
García Araujo was a consultant for many boards of directors in different Venezuelan holding companies, such as Grupo Vollmer, Grupo Mendoza, Grupo Mercantil and as economical adviser to Hospital de Clinicas Caracas and Electricidad de Caracas, an electricity distribution company. In 2007, Electricidad de Caracas became a government-owned company.

After 1990, Garcia Araujo was known as an expert advising family business organizations in Venezuela. He gave family business conferences within Venezuela and internationally.

Guild 
García Araujo was president of Asociación Venezolana de Ejecutivos (AVE) between 1966 and 1968, and a founding and active member of the corporate governance committee in the same institution. AVE is an institution that promotes training and education for Venezuelan managers.

Academic institutions
In 1961, he was a founding member of Institute of Advanced Studies in Administration (IESA) in Caracas. He was a professor at Universidad Rafael Urdaneta in Maracaibo and the founder of Andres Bello Fellowship at Oxford University.

Works 
 
 
 Mauricio García Araujo, The impact of petrodollars on the economy and the public sector of Venezuela, Latin American Studies Association, National Meeting, 1982.

References

External links 
  Asociación Venezolana de Ejecutivos (AVE)

1930 births
2012 deaths
Presidents of the Central Bank of Venezuela
Columbia Business School alumni
20th-century Venezuelan economists